Cnephalodes is a genus of bristle flies in the family Tachinidae, native to Australia. There is at least one described species in Cnephalodes, C. pollinosus.

References

Further reading

External links

 
 

Tachinidae